The 1956 Delaware State Hornets football team represented Delaware State College—now known as Delaware State University—as a member of the Central Intercollegiate Athletic Association (CIAA) in the 1956 NCAA College Division football season. Led by coach Bennie J. George in his first year, the Hornets compiled a 7–1–1 record, winning the second conference title in school history.

Schedule

Notes

References

Delaware State
Delaware State Hornets football seasons
Delaware State Hornets football